Strawberry is a ghost town in White Pine County in the U.S. state of Nevada along Nevada State Route 892. The town was known for its 12,000-tree orchard and huge fields of strawberries. Strawberry is mainly used today as a ranching settlement.  The post office was in operation from 1899 until 1938.

References

External links
 </ref>

Ghost towns in White Pine County, Nevada
Historic districts in Nevada
Ghost towns in Nevada
Great Basin National Heritage Area